Alexander Kunze (born 12 January 1971 in Marienberg, East Germany) is a retired German footballer, and the current goalkeeping coach of FC Ingolstadt 04. As a player, he spent six seasons in the 2. Bundesliga with Braunschweig, SV Babelsberg 03, and Chemnitzer FC.

References

External links

1971 births
Living people
People from Marienberg
Footballers from Saxony
German footballers
East German footballers
Eintracht Braunschweig players
Chemnitzer FC players
SV Babelsberg 03 players
Association football goalkeepers
2. Bundesliga players
Eintracht Braunschweig non-playing staff